Lytton Springs is an unincorporated community in northeastern Caldwell County, Texas, United States. According to the Handbook of Texas, the community had a population of 500 in 2000. It is located within the Greater Austin metropolitan area.

History
The community was originally called Albade in the 1850s when it first began to be settled. Its post office was called Albade and was established in 1859. It was viewed as somewhat scattered. The nearby Lytton Springs caused the community to be called this in the early 1860s and was officially changed to that name in 1888. There was a cotton gin that was powered by steam, a Baptist church, and a general store in the mid-1880s. Most of the community's early settlers raised livestock. Ranching gave way to cotton in the 1900s, but it was revived in 1930 as an important economic value. Oil was discovered in the community in 1925, but only a few wells were producing it in the 1940s. The post office closed in 1958 and mail was sent to the community from Dale. On the 1989 county highway map, there were three churches, two cemeteries, and only one business in Lytton Springs. The community had 125 inhabitants in the mid-1880s. It then grew to 300 by the 1890s. 131 people were living in the community in 1900 and grew to 200 by the 1920s. It fell to 116 by the 1960s. It then had 76 inhabitants in the early 1970s and stayed at that number through 1990. The population then grew dramatically to 500 in 2000.

When Hurricane Harvey hit Texas in 2017, a vehicle had to be abandoned before it was swept away by a flood. In December 2016, two men committed a murder-suicide in Lytton Springs.

Geography
Lytton Springs stands along Farm to Market Road 1854, ten miles northeast of Lockhart in northeastern Caldwell County.

Climate
The climate in this area is characterized by hot, humid summers and generally mild to cool winters.  According to the Köppen Climate Classification system, Lytton Springs has a humid subtropical climate, abbreviated "Cfa" on climate maps.

Education
Lytton Springs had a school in the mid-1880s. Today the community is served by the Lockhart Independent School District.

In fall 2016, a new elementary school, Alma Brewer Strawn Elementary School, was opened in Lytton Springs. It was named for a respected staff member named Alma Brewer Strawn who taught in the district and retired before the campus opened. The district then organized an attendance zone map for its elementary school students, who originally were assigned a school to attend.
It is the first campus to be built outside of the Lockhart city limits and teaches grades PK–5, while the elementary schools in Lockhart now teach K-5 and Carver Kindergarten School, now George W. Carver Early Childhood Academy teaches only Pre-kindergarten.

References

Unincorporated communities in Caldwell County, Texas
Unincorporated communities in Texas